Karl Oppitzhauser (born 4 October 1941, in Bruck an der Leitha) is a former racing driver from Austria. He is chiefly known for his optimistic attempt to enter the 1976 Formula One Austrian Grand Prix.

Career
Oppitzhauser began his career in Formula Vee in the 1960s, and also raced a Lotus Europa. By 1968 he had progressed to a Ferrari Dino, and later a Lamborghini Miura, before competing in the Alfasud Cup in the mid-1970s.

In 1976, Oppitzhauser attempted to enter the Austrian Grand Prix with the local ÖASC Racing Team, driving a March 761, despite having little experience in single seater racing cars. Due to this lack of experience, both Oppitzhauser and his teammate Otto Stuppacher were refused entry to the event.  Unlike Stuppacher, Oppitzhauser did not make any further attempts at Formula One.

After his Formula One attempt, Oppitzhauser entered a Brands Hatch round of the Shellsport G8 Formula 5000 Championship, but did not start the race. He switched to touring car racing, and competed with a BMW 635CSi in Group 5.

During the early 1980s, Oppitzhauser changed sports, trying his hand at harness racing, before returning to touring cars in 1984, where he stayed until 1992. From 1995 to 1999, he participated in the Ferrari 355 Challenge, then switched to a Ferrari 360 Modena, winning the European Group 2 Ferrari Challenge in 2001. He subsequently moved up to the Group 1 Ferrari Challenge. His last Ferrari Challenge entry came at Imola in 2017, finishing 22nd in the amateur class.

Oppitzhauser now runs a Chrysler, Jeep, Dodge and Hyundai dealership in his home town of Bruck.

Racing record

Complete World Sportscar Championship results
(key) (Races in bold indicate pole position) (Races in italics indicate fastest lap)

Footnotes

Complete Formula One World Championship results
(key)

Complete Shellsport International Series results
(key) (Races in bold indicate pole position; races in italics indicate fastest lap.)

References

External links
Official website (German)

Austrian racing drivers
Austrian Formula One drivers
Austrian people of German descent
1941 births
Living people
People from Bruck an der Leitha
Sportspeople from Lower Austria

Ferrari Challenge drivers